Philippe Dallier (born 8 December 1962) is a French politician, and a member of the Senate of France.  He represents Seine-Saint-Denis, in the Île-de-France region, and is a member of The Republicans party.

References
Page on the Senate website

1962 births
Living people
People from Levallois-Perret
French Senators of the Fifth Republic
Union for a Popular Movement politicians
The Republicans (France) politicians
Mayors of places in Île-de-France
Senators of Seine-Saint-Denis
Knights of the Ordre national du Mérite